Zhanar or Janar (Kazakh or Russian: Жанар) is a Kazakh female given name. Notable people with the name include:

Zhanar Aitzhanova (born 1965), Kazakhstani minister 
Zhanar Dugalova (born 1987), Kazakh singer 
Zhanar Zhanzunova (born 1985), Kazakhstani judoka

Kazakh given names